Thomas Köhler (born 25 June 1940) is an East German former luger who competed during the 1960s.

He won three Winter Olympic medals in men's luge with two golds (Singles: 1964, Doubles: 1968) and one silver (Singles: 1968).

Köhler won five medals at the FIL World Luge Championships with three golds (singles: 1962, 1967; doubles: 1967) and one silver (doubles: 1965).

References

 Encyclopædia Britannica online article on Köhler
 Fuzilogik Sports – Winter Olympic results – Men's luge
 Hickok sports information on World champions in luge and skeleton.

1940 births
Living people
People from Oberwiesenthal
German male lugers
Olympic lugers of the United Team of Germany
Olympic lugers of East Germany
Olympic gold medalists for the United Team of Germany
Olympic gold medalists for East Germany
Olympic silver medalists for East Germany
Olympic medalists in luge
Lugers at the 1964 Winter Olympics
Lugers at the 1968 Winter Olympics
Medalists at the 1964 Winter Olympics
Medalists at the 1968 Winter Olympics
Recipients of the Patriotic Order of Merit
Sportspeople from Saxony